Tracey Ullman Show may  refer to:
 For the American 1980s series  The Tracey Ullman Show
 For the British 2016 series Tracey Ullman's Show